Bé Fáil, Gaelic-Irish female given name.

Bearers of the name

 Bé Fáil ingen Sechnusaigh, died 741.
 Bé Fáil ingen Cathail, Queen of Ireland, died 798.

External links
 http://medievalscotland.org/kmo/AnnalsIndex/Feminine/BeFail.shtml

Irish-language feminine given names